Rendu Jella Sita is a 1983 Telugu comedy film, written and directed by Jandhyala. The film stars Naresh, Rajesh, Pradeep Kondiparthi, Subhakar and Mahalakshmi in lead roles, while Allu Ramalingaih appears in a prominent role.

Plot
Four men, Gopi (Naresh), Mohan (Rajesh), Krishna (Pradeep) and Murthy (Subhakar) fall for Seetha (Mahalakshmi), and try to impress her. One day they all go to Seetha and ask her whom she loves among the four. Seetha replies that it is Madhu (Kamalakar). They all are shocked.

Then Seetha narrates the flashback. When Seetha was travelling in a bus, Madhu is standing beside her and when he is trying to give money to conductor his coin slips into Seetha's blouse. The conductor asks for change, but he has no change, the conductor asks him to get down. Madhu says he has an exam, then Seetha gets a ticket for him too. Seetha teaches music for Madhu's friend's sisters and some girls. There he proposes to her by showing a classical song in a music book. She responds with the same feeling by showing another song. Madhu conveys the matter to Seetha's parents and they feel happy for their child. Madhu asks his father Gandabherundam (Allu Ramalingaih), who doesn't like the match, but pretends to agree upon pressure from Madhu.

Seetha's father goes to meet Gandabherundam to ask when the marriage will be there; Gandabherundam falsely says that he promised lord Venkatesa that the money he receives as dowry for his son's marriage will be given to God. So Seetha's father agrees as it is a sentimental thing. He works hard, makes all the arrangements and at the last moment, one man comes and says that they don't want this marriage and returns money also. Seetha's father goes to Gandabherundam and asks the reason, and they say that Seetha has an affair with someone else. Seetha's family moves from there. The flashback ends.

Now, these four go to the village and enquire about the matter. They want to teach Gandabherundam a lesson. They provoke Kameswara Rao (Subhalekha Sudhakar) to love Gandabherundam's daughter. Meanwhile, they will get to know that the reason for rejecting Seetha was photographs showing Seetha with friend of Madhu, who has feelings for Seetha and for whose sisters Seetha taught music classes. Gandabherundam, along with this person makes fake photos and destroys Madhu's feelings. On the marriage of Gandabherundam's daughter with Kameswara Rao, these four stop the marriage and show photographs of Madhu's sister with the same person with Seetha in the photograph. Madhu objects to it then brings the person; he says that they love each other. Then they make Madhu understand that his father gave money to make all these things. They say that at the time, Seetha has no brother to ask like you, now she has four brothers. Madhu realises the mistake and two marriages takes place.

Cast

 Naresh as Gopi
 Rajesh as Mohan
 Pradeep as Krishna
 Subhakar as Murthy
 Mahalakshmi as Seetha
 Allu Ramalingaih as Gandabherundam
 Kamalakar as Madhu
 Subhalekha Sudhakar as Kameswara Rao
 Sakshi Ranga Rao as Suryanarayana
 Suttivelu as Subbarao
 Srilakshmi as Anasooya
 Suthi Veerabhadra Rao as Retd. Major Mangapathi
 Potti Prasad as A. A. Rao

Production

Development 
Jandhyala had good relations with make-up man, producer Jayakrishna, from early in his career. When Jandhyala turned to a director from his screen-writing and dialogue-writing career, Jayakrishna used to visit his shooting regularly. Once Jandhyala narrated this story-line to Jayakrishna. When Keshavarao (then film distributor) asked to help him to find a better script and assist him in his trials to produce movies, Jayakrishna recommended him doing a movie with Jandhyala. After their initial discussions about the script and budget matters, the movie started eventually.

Casting 
The script demands four young actors as heroes. Jandhyala selected Pradeep for one of the four roles, to whom Jandhyala continued offering roles in every one of the films directed by him till then, from his directional debut Mudda Mandaram. After this film, Pradeep ended his career as a film actor and later he has done many roles in television serials. For the other three roles, Jandhyala selected Naresh,  Rajesh and Subhakar. Subhakar later became famous by his role in Mayuri. Rajesh, who made his debut as the hero in Jandhyala's directorial movie Nelavanka, and is brother of popular comedy actress Sri Lakshmi, has been selected to do another hero character.
Jandhyala conducted selections for the title role as Seetha. Vijayashanti, Bhanupriya, Shobhana and many others had been rejected for the role and he selected Mahalakshmi, daughter of former actress Pushpalatha, for the title role. Pushpalatha also played a role in this film as the mother of Seetha. Movie organizer Jayakrishna offered Sri Lakshmi, who later become a popular comedy actress in Telugu industry, a guest role in this movie. Her brother Rajesh suggested that she turn down the offer because he thought doing a cameo role while she has done heroine characters was not a good idea. Despite of her brother's suggestions, she accepted the offer. Eventually the guest role became a complete comedy role, whose success paved way to her successful career as a comedy actress in Telugu movies.

Filming 
Filming started on 4 October 1982 in Kanaka Mahalakshmi temple, Visakhapatnam. Most of the shooting occurred in Visakhapatnam, Araku Valley, Vijayanagaram and other places around Visakhapatnam city. The film unit hired a building opposite Ramakrishna beach, Visakhapatnam and shot it as the residence of the heroes.
Filming completed in 45 days and Rs.13,75,000 was spent on the movie.

References

External links
 

1983 films
Films directed by Jandhyala
Films scored by Ramesh Naidu
1980s Telugu-language films